Pursuant to Article 43 of the Law on Internal Regulations of the Islamic Consultative Assembly (Parliament of the Islamic Republic of Iran), the Internal Regulation Commission of the Islamic Consultative Assembly is responsible for reviewing plans and bills proposed by the representatives and branches to amendment of internal regulations and change in the process of implementation of affairs of the Assembly. The commission evaluates the relevant plans and bills and reports the result. Each of the fifteen branches of the Islamic Consultative Assembly is obliged to nominate one of its qualified members to be a member of this commission so that the result can be determined after reviewing his / her credentials. Therefore, the Internal Regulation Commission of the Islamic Consultative Assembly will have 15 members.

Members 
The members of the Internal Regulation Commission of the Islamic Consultative Assembly in the second year of the 11th term of the Assembly are as follows:

See also 
 Specialized Commissions of the Parliament of Iran
 Joint Commission of the Islamic Consultative Assembly
 Iranian Parliament Commission on Energy
 The history of the parliament in Iran

References

Committees of the Iranian Parliament
Islamic Consultative Assembly